She's Gone may refer to:

Music

Songs
“She’s Gone”, a song by L.A.B
"She's Gone", a song by Bob Marley from Kaya
"She's Gone" (Hall & Oates song)
"She's Gone" (Steelheart song)
"She's Gone", a song by Black Sabbath from Technical Ecstasy
"She's Gone", a song by Brutha from Brutha
"She's Gone", a song by Eric Clapton from Pilgrim
"She's Gone", a song by NOFX from White Trash, Two Heebs and a Bean
"She's Gone", a song by Soft Machine, produced by Joe Boyd
"She's Gone", a song by Suggs from The Lone Ranger
"She's Gone (Critical)", a song by Bang Camaro from Bang Camaro II
"She's Gone", a song by Tindersticks originally from Tindersticks (1995 album)

Other music
She's Gone, a 2013 album by Upset

Other uses
She's Gone (film), a 2004 UK television film
She's Gone, 2007 debut novel by Kwame Dawes
She Is Gone, an alternative title for the poem "Remember Me" by English painter and poet David Harkins

See also
"She's Gone, Gone, Gone", a 1965 country music song written by Harlan Howard